Carphurus elegans is a species of soft-wing flower beetles (beetles of the family Melyridae) in the subfamily Malachiinae and tribe Carphurini. It is found in Queensland, Australia.

References

External links 

 Carphurus elegans at Atlas of Living Australia

Melyridae
Beetles described in 1909
Beetles of Australia
Insects of Queensland
Taxa named by Arthur Mills Lea